Nepal participated in the 2014 Asian Games in Incheon, South Korea from 19 September to 4 October 2014.

Medal table

Medalists

Archery

Badminton

Basketball

Boxing

Cricket

Cycling

Fencing

Football

Golf

Gymnastics

Judo

Male 
 Saroj Maharjan (Extra lightweight)
 Ramesh Magar (Half lightweight)

Female 
 Devika Khadka (Half lightweight)

Karate

Bimala Tamang

Shooting

Soft tennis

Table Tennis

Taekwondo

Tennis

Triathlon

Weightlifting

Wrestling

References

Nations at the 2014 Asian Games
2014
Asian Games